Jean-Pierre Bacri (24 May 1951 – 18 January 2021) was a French actor and screenwriter.

He frequently worked in collaboration with Agnès Jaoui.

Life and career
One of Bacri's earliest film appearances was Subway. He co-wrote with Jaoui Smoking/No Smoking, and  co-wrote and starred in Un air de famille, On connaît la chanson, for which he won a César Award for Best Actor in a Supporting Role in 1998, The Taste of Others and Look at Me. Together, he and Jaoui have won the César Award for Best Writing four times, the Best Screenplay Award at the 2004 Cannes Film Festival and the European Film Awards, and the René Clair Award in 2001.

He died of cancer in 2021 at the age of 69.

Filmography

As screenwriter
 1977: Tout simplement
 1978: Le Timbre
 1979: Le Doux visage de l'amour (Prix de la fondation de la vocation)
 1992: Cuisine et dépendances
 1992: Smoking / No Smoking
 1996: Un air de famille
 1997: On connaît la chanson (Same Old Song)
 2000: The Taste of Others (Le Goût des autres)
 2004: Comme une image (Look at Me)
 2008: Parlez-moi de la pluie (Let's Talk about the Rain)

As actor
 1978: Le goût étrange de Juliette
 1979: L'éblouissement (TV) - Jean-Pierre
 1979: Le Toubib - L'anesthésiste
 1979: Thanatos Palace Hôtel (TV) - Jean Monnier
 1980: Le fourbe de Séville (TV) - Octavio
 1980: La Vénus d'Ille (TV) - Alphonse
 1980: La femme intégrale - Léonardo l'italien
 1980: L'Aéropostale, courrier du ciel (TV series) - Beauregard
 1981: Le cocu magnifique (TV) - Petrus
 1981: Henri IV (TV) - Landolf
 1982: Le Grand Pardon directed by Alexandre Arcady - Jacky Azoulay
 1982: Au théâtre ce soir : Histoire de rire (TV) - Gérard
 1983: Coup de foudre - Costa
 1983: Édith et Marcel
 1984: La Septième Cible - inspecteur Daniel Esperanza
 1984: Batailles (TV)
 1985: Subway directed by Luc Besson - inspecteur Batman
 1985: Escalier C - Bruno
 1985: On ne meurt que deux fois - barman
 1986: Chère canaille - Francis Lebovic
 1986: La galette du roi - L'élégant
 1986: Suivez mon regard - L'ami des singes
 1986: États d'âme - Romain
 1986: Mort un dimanche de pluie - David Briand
 1986: Rue du départ - homme à la BMW
 1987: Sale temps - (voix)
 1987: L'été en pente douce directed by Gérard Krawczyk - Stéphane Leheurt (Fane)
 1988: Les Saisons du plaisir directed by Jean-Pierre Mocky - Jacques
 1988: Bonjour l'angoisse - Desfontaines
 1989: Mes meilleurs copains - Eric Guidolini (Guido)
 1990: La Baule-les-Pins (film) directed by Diane Kurys - Léon
 1991:  - Roussel
 1992:  - L'homme à la rayure
 1992: L'homme de ma vie - Malcolm
 1993: Cuisine et dépendances - Georges
 1994: Perle rare
 1994: Bazooka (film)
 1994: La Cité de la peur directed by Alain Berbérian - projectionniste #2
 1996: Un air de famille directed by Cédric Klapisch - Henri
 1997: La méthode - Paul
 1997: Didier directed by Alain Chabat - Jean-Pierre Costa
 1997: On connaît la chanson directed by Alain Resnais - Nicolas
 1998: Un dimanche matin à Marseille : Béranger - Béranger
 1998: Place Vendôme directed by Nicole Garcia - Jean-Pierre
 1999: Peut-être - le père
 1999: Kennedy et moi directed by Sam Karmann - Simon Polaris
 2000: The Taste of Others (Le Goût des autres) directed by Agnès Jaoui - Castella
 2002: Asterix & Obelix: Mission Cleopatra - (la voix du commentateur langouste)
 2002: Une femme de ménage directed by Claude Berri - Jacques
 2003: Les Sentiments directed by Noémie Lvovsky - Jacques
 2004: Comme une image directed by Agnès Jaoui - Etienne Cassard
 2006: Selon Charlie directed by Nicole Garcia
 2008: Parlez-moi de la pluie (Let's Talk about the rain)
 2012: Looking for Hortense
 2013: Under the Rainbow
 2015: The Very Private Life of Mister Sim
 2016: Tout de suite maintenant
 2017: C'est la vie!
 2018: Place publique directed by Agnes Jaoui - Castro

References

External links 

1951 births
2021 deaths
20th-century French male actors
21st-century French male actors
Best Supporting Actor César Award winners
European Film Award for Best Screenwriter winners
French male film actors
French male screenwriters
French male television actors
French people of Algerian-Jewish descent
20th-century French screenwriters
Jewish French male actors
People from Bou Ismaïl
Pieds-Noirs
20th-century French male writers
21st-century French screenwriters
21st-century French male writers
Cannes Film Festival Award for Best Screenplay winners